Dast-e Ney is a village in Emamzadeh Seyyed Mahmud Rural District, Sardasht District, Dezful County, Khuzestan Province, Iran. In a 2006 census, its population was 41, in 6 families.

References 

Populated places in Dezful County